was the pen name of Sano Shōichi (佐野 昌一), the founding father of Japanese science fiction. He was born to a family of medical doctors in Tokushima city. In 1928 he opened his writer’s career with The case of the mysterious death in the electric bath (Denkifuro no kaishijiken).

During the Pacific War he wrote a great number of science-fiction novels, remaining in Tokyo throughout the air raids. Japan’s defeat in World War II was for him a hard blow, and Unno spent the last years in his life in a state of deep depression. 

Unno's scientific work was influenced by that of Nikola Tesla.

Captain Jūzō Okita of Space Battleship Yamato was so named as a tribute.

Works

 Aru Uchū-jin no Himitsu (ある宇宙塵の秘密)
 Angō Onban Jiken (暗号音盤事件)
 Ikiteiru Chō (生きている腸)
 Uchū Joshū Dai Ichi-gō (宇宙女囚第一号)
 Uchū Sentai (宇宙戦隊)
 Uchū Senpei (宇宙尖兵)
 Uchū no Maigo (宇宙の迷子)
 Unno Jūza Haisen Nikki (海野十三敗戦日記)
 Ei Hondo Jōriku Sakusen no Zen'ya (英本土上陸作戦の前夜)
 Osoroshiki Tsuya (恐しき通夜)
 Gaikotsukan (骸骨館)
 Kaisei Gan (怪星ガン)
 Kaitei Toshi (海底都市)
 Kagi kara Nukedashita Onna (鍵から抜け出した女)
 Kaban Rashikunai Kaban (鞄らしくない鞄)
 Kayakusen (火薬船)
 Kifutsudō Jiken (鬼仏洞事件)
 Kyōryū-tei no Bōken (恐竜艇の冒険)
 Kyōryū-tō (恐竜島)
 Kinzoku Ningen (金属人間)
 Kūchū Hyōryū Isshūkan (空中漂流一週間)
 Gun'yōzame (軍用鮫)
 Kōun no Kuroko (幸運の黒子)
 Kokusai Satsujin-dan no Hōkai (国際殺人団の崩壊)
 Sankakkei no Kyōfu (三角形の恐怖)
 Sanju-nen Go no Sekai (三十年後の世界)
 Sannin no Sōseiji (三人の双生児)
 Jigoku Kaidō (地獄街道)
 Jūhachi-ji no Ongaku-yoku (十八時の音楽浴)
 Shōnen Tanteichō (少年探偵長)
 Jinzō Ningen Efu-shi (人造人間エフ氏)
 Sekigaisen Otoko (赤外線男)
 Sen-nen Go no Sekai (千年後の世界)
 Dai Uchū Enseitai (大宇宙遠征隊)
 Dai Go Hyōgaki (第五氷河期)
 Chikyū Yōsai (地球要塞)
 Chikyū wo Nerau Mono (地球を狙う者)
 Chichūma (地中魔)
 Chō-Ningen X-go (超人間Ｘ号)
 Tōmei Neko (透明猫)
 Tokkyo Tawan Ningen Hōshiki (特許多腕人間方式)
 2000 nen Sensō (二、〇〇〇年戦争)
 Nō no Naka no Reijin (脳の中の麗人)
 Hitotsubokan (一坪館)
 Hyōgaki no Kaijin (氷河期の怪人)
 Fushigikoku Tanken (ふしぎ国探検)
 Fushū (俘囚)
 Hōsō Sareta Yuigon (放送された遺言)
 Maruamru Jū (○○獣)
 Miezaru Teki (見えざる敵)
 Yūsei Shokumin Setsu (遊星植民説)
 Yūrei-sen no Himitsu (幽霊船の秘密)
 Yohōshō Kokuji (予報省告示)
 Reikon Dai Jū-gō no Himitsu (霊魂第十号の秘密)
 Jinzō Ningen Satsugai Jiken (人造人間殺害事件)

Utei Tenku Series
Utei Tenku Series (烏啼天駆シリーズ):
 Kizoku wa Shiharau (奇賊は支払う)
 Shinzō Tōnan (心臓盗難)
 Kizoku Higan (奇賊悲願)
 Angō no Yakuwari (暗号の役割)
 Surikae Kaiga (すり替え怪画)

Under alias of Oka Kyūjūrō
 Yukima (雪魔)
 Chikyū Hakkyō Jiken (地球発狂事件)

English Translations
 Fast Forward Japan: Stories by the Founding Father of Japanese Science Fiction [includes: Eighteen O'Clock Music Bath (十八時の音楽浴), The Theory of Planetary Colonization, The World in One Thousand Years, Four-Dimensional Man, Mysterious Spatial Rift, The Living Intestine, Crematoria, The Last Broadcast, Adventures of the Dinosaur-Craft]
 The Secret of the Cosmic Dust (ある宇宙塵の秘密). Translated by Till Weingärtner. The Irish Journal of Asian Studies Vol.7, 2021.

References

External links
E-texts of Unno's works at Aozora Bunko 
Entry in The Encyclopedia of Science Fiction
Full text of an English translation of Unno Juza's story "Mysterious Spacial Rift" (不思議なる空間断層) on Historyradio.org.

1897 births
1949 deaths
Japanese fantasy writers
Japanese science fiction writers
Japanese mystery writers
Waseda University alumni
People from Tokushima Prefecture
Writers from Tokushima Prefecture
20th-century deaths from tuberculosis
Tuberculosis deaths in Japan